Benjamin Vautier may refer to:
 Benjamin Vautier (Swiss artist) (1829–1898), Swiss genre painter
 Ben Vautier (born 1935), French artist